2013 consisted of 340 Rugby union matches that included an international nation, with 295 of the matches being classed a test match. 126 international teams played at least one test either at home, away or at a neutral venue. On 154 occasions, the home side won, 118 away sides won, 5 draws and 63 neutral venue matches. 2013 marked two years to the 2015 Rugby World Cup, meaning for most tournaments; Africa Cup, Asian Five Nations, European Nations Cup, Oceania Cup and South American Rugby Championship acted as Rugby World Cup qualifiers. The Americas playoffs saw the first team to qualify for the World Cup, with Canada winning 40–20 on aggregate against the United States, to join Pool D as Americas 1. The fourteenth edition of the Six Nations Championship took place in February and March with Wales retaining the championship with a 30–3 record winning margin against England, while in August, September and October, the second edition of the Rugby Championship took place with New Zealand completing the sweep winning 6 from 6 to retain the championship.

June 2013, the busiest month of the year at 87 matches or 73 test matches, marked 125 years of the British & Irish Lions, as the Lions embarked on a 3-test tour against Australia, finishing with a historic 41–16 victory to seal a 2–1 test series win for the first time in 16 years. To end the year, November 2013 saw the number one test side the All Blacks win their fourteenth from fourteenth test match of the year, the first team to win every match in a calendar year in the professional era.

The IRB World Rankings changed very little from the end of 2012 to the end of 2013. New Zealand remained ranked number one a position they have held since 2010, South Africa stayed in second and Australia in third. England moved up to fourth from fifth where they were in 2012, while Samoa remained the highest tier 2 side despite falling one place to eighth in 2013. Japan slowly climbs the rankings ahead of their home Rugby World Cup in 2019 following a successful year. They earned their first win over Wales in Tokyo in June, before hosting the All Blacks for the first time in Japan. They scored the most tries than any other team at 75, 18 of which came in their 121–0 win over Philippines. Spain drew more matches than any other team this year, while Benin, Brunei and Burundi failed to score a single point in all their international matches.

The 340 matches below all contain an international team, some of which are not members of the International Rugby Board:

January

February

March

April

May

June

July

August

September

October

November

December

References

External links
 ESPN 2013 Season
 The Roonba 2013 Rugby Union results
 International Rugby Board – official website